Keith Francis James Drinan (13 November 1924 – 11 August 2004) was an Australian rules footballer in the VFL. 

Drinan, who served with the Royal Australian Navy during the war, played for St Kilda initially as Half-back flank then Centre Half-Back before establishing himself as a great full back. Won the club's Best and fairest twice and was captain for a total of five years (Les Foote was captain-coach in between Drinan's two stints). He wore number 25 and later coached Yarraville (in 1961). His older brother Jack Drinan also played for St Kilda.

After his death, Neil Roberts said: "Keith was a tough, underrated and inspiring leader in every way and it was a pleasure to play under him. He regularly kept the great John Coleman to less than two goals a game."

References

External links

St Kilda Hall of Fame Profile
Saints honor roll
WW2 Nominal Roll: Keith Drinan\

Trevor Barker Award winners
1924 births
2004 deaths
St Kilda Football Club players
Yarraville Football Club players
Yarraville Football Club coaches
Australian rules footballers from Victoria (Australia)
Royal Australian Navy personnel of World War II
Military personnel from Victoria (Australia)